John Joshua McKiernan (born January 2002) is a professional footballer who plays for Eastleigh FC as a central midfielder on loan from EFL Championship team Watford FC and the Northern Ireland U21 national team.

Club career 
Born in Southampton, McKiernan joined Watford FC at U18 level in December 2018 having previously played for non-league Andover Town FC in the FA Youth Cup. He signed his professional contract in July 2021 and has been given squad number 43.

McKiernan moved to Bohemian FC on loan in January 2022 and made 1 appearance before returning to Watford FC to attend pre-season training camp in Austria, including an appearance against Panathinaikos.

McKiernan joined Vanarama national league team Eastleigh FC in August 2022 on loan.

International career 
McKiernan is eligible to represent England and Northern Ireland at international level. McKiernan chose to represent Northern Ireland at international level, qualifying through his paternal grandparents. He was selected at 18 to make his debut with Andy Crosby's U21 squad against Finland, obtaining a yellow card in the 21st minute.

Career statistics

References 

2002 births
Living people